The Kazakhstan women's national ice hockey team represents Kazakhstan in top international ice hockey competition, including the International Ice Hockey Federation's Women's World Championship. The women's national team is controlled by Kazakhstan Ice Hockey Federation. Kazakhstan had 127 female players in 2011.

Tournament record

Olympic Games
2002 – Finished in 8th place

World Championship
1999 – Finished in 17th/18th place (1st in Pool B qualifying group, promoted to Pool B)
2000 – Finished in 9th place (1st in Pool B, promoted to Top Division)
2001 – Finished in 8th place (relegated to Division I)
2003 – Finished in 10th place (2nd in Division I)
2004 – Finished in 10th place (1st in Division I, promoted to Top Division)
2005 – Finished in 7th place
2007 – Finished in 9th place
2008 – Finished in 10th place (1st in Division I, promoted to Top Division)
2009 – Finished in 6th place
2011 – Finished in 8th place (relegated to Division I)
2012 – Finished in 14th place (6th in Division IA, relegated to Division IB)
2013 – Finished in 19th place (5th in Division IB)
2014 – Finished in 20th place (6th in Division IB, relegated to Division IIA)
2015 – Finished in 21st place (1st in Division IIA, promoted to Division IB)
2016 – Finished in 17th place (3rd in Division IB)
2017 – Finished in 16th place (2nd in Division IB)
2018 – Finished in 19th place (4th in Division IB)
2019 – Finished in 21st place (5th in Division IB)
2020 – Cancelled due to the COVID-19 pandemic
2021 – Cancelled due to the COVID-19 pandemic
2022 – Finished in 19th place (4th in Division IB)

Asian Winter Games
Kazakhstan has participated in every women's ice hockey tournament contested at the Asian Winter games. The squad has claimed a medal in every tournament including three golds.
 1996 – 3rd  
 1999 – 3rd  
 2003 – 1st  
 2007 – 1st  
 2011 – 1st  
 2017 – 3rd

European Championship
1996 – Finished in 13th place (7th in Pool B)

Team

Current roster
The roster for the 2022 IIHF Women's World Championship Division I Group B tournament.

Head coach: Alexander MaltsevAssistant coach: Natalya Skobelkina

All-time record against other nations
Last match update: 12 March 2022

References

External links

IIHF profile

 
Women's national ice hockey teams in Asia
Women's national ice hockey teams in Europe
National team